The La Grange Church and Cemetery is a historic Carpenter Gothic  church and cemetery in Titusville, Florida, United States. It is located at 1575 Old Dixie Highway. On December 7, 1995, it was added to the U.S. National Register of Historic Places.

National Register listing
La Grange Church and Cemetery
(added 1995 - Building - #95001413)
Also known as FMSF# 8DR454*
1575 Old Dixie Hwy., Titusville
Historic Significance: 	Architecture/Engineering, Event
Architect, builder, or engineer: 	Mims, B.J., et al., Feasterr, J.N. & J.C.C.
Area of Significance: 	Architecture, Social History
Period of Significance: 	1875–1899, 1900–1924, 1925–1949
Owner: 	Private
Historic Function: 	Funerary, Religion
Historic Sub-function: 	Cemetery, Religious Structure
Current Function: 	Funerary, Vacant/Not In Use
Current Sub-function: 	Cemetery

Notable burials
 Harriette Moore (1902–1952). School teacher and social reformer, killed by a planted bomb in her home
 Harry T. Moore (1905–1951). Teacher and civil right activist and husband of Harriette, killed by the same bomb
 Henry T. Titus (1823–1881). Pioneer, soldier of fortune, and founder of Titusville

See also
 National Register of Historic Places listings in Florida

References

External links
 
 Brevard County listings at National Register of Historic Places
 Florida's Office of Cultural and Historical Programs
 Brevard County markers
 LaGrange Church and Cemetery
Historical Society of North Brevard article on La Grange Church

Cemeteries on the National Register of Historic Places in Florida
National Register of Historic Places in Brevard County, Florida
Churches on the National Register of Historic Places in Florida
Carpenter Gothic church buildings in Florida
Churches in Brevard County, Florida
Buildings and structures in Titusville, Florida
1869 establishments in Florida
Churches completed in 1869